"The Day You Went Away" is a song by English pop/soul group Soul Family Sensation. The song was the third single, released in February 1992 on One Little Indian Records, from the group's debut studio album, New Wave. It was written by Guy Batson and Johnny Male. Despite the success of their first single, "I Don't Even Know If I Should Call You Baby", which peaked at  49 on the UK Singles Chart, "The Day You Went Away" did not chart. In 1992, Australian singer-songwriter Wendy Matthews covered the song and reached No. 2 on the Australian Singles Chart with her version.

Track listings
7-inch single
A. "The Day You Went Away"
AA. "Other Stuff" (Piccadilly Line mix)

12-inch and CD single
 "The Day You Went Away"
 "Other Stuff" (Circle Line mix)
 "Other Stuff" (Piccadilly Line mix)
 "Other Stuff" (Central Line mix)

Wendy Matthews version

Wendy Matthews' cover was released 31 August 1992 by rooArt as the lead single from her second solo studio album, Lily (1992). The song debuted on the Australian ARIA Singles Chart in August 1992, eventually peaking at No. 2 in December of the same year. This is Matthews' highest-charting single on the Australian chart. In the United Kingdom and Europe, the song was released on rooART in 1993 but was not a hit. Matthews subsequently included the song on her 1999 Greatest Hits album, Stepping Stones, and her 2007 compilation album, The Essential Wendy Matthews.

"The Day You Went Away" won two ARIA Music Awards at the ARIA Music Awards of 1993: one for Single of the Year and one for Highest Selling Single.

Composition
"The Day You Went Away" is performed in a slow  time with a vocal range of E4 to C6.

Track listings

Charts

Weekly charts

Year-end charts

Sales and certifications

References

1992 singles
1992 songs
ARIA Award-winning songs
One Little Indian Records singles
Song recordings produced by T Bone Burnett
Wendy Matthews songs